Tzemach Yehoshua Cunin (March 27, 1976 – July 5, 2019) was an American rabbi, and the founder of the Chabad of Century City in Los Angeles, California.

Life
Cunin was born on March 27, 1976 to Shlomo Cunin, the director of Chabad-Lubavitch of California.

Cunin assisted his father in his ongoing effort to repatriate the Schneerson Library from Russia to the United States beginning when he was a teenager and continuing into adulthood. In 1990, Cunin founded the Chabad of Century City in Los Angeles. He also founded Beis Chaya Mushka, an all-girl school in Los Angeles.

Cunin married Ada Wilschanski in 2000; they had five children. He died on July 5, 2019, at 43.

References

1976 births
2019 deaths
Rabbis from Los Angeles
Chabad-Lubavitch rabbis